The Page Boy at the Golden Lion (German: Der Piccolo vom Goldenen Löwen) is a 1928 German silent comedy film directed by Carl Boese and starring Fritz Kampers,  Gustl Gstettenbaur and Maria Mindzenty. It was shot at the Terra and National Studios in Berlin. The film's art direction was by Karl Machus.

Cast
Fritz Kampers as Fritz Leplow
Gustl Gstettenbaur as Peter Pohlmann
Maria Mindzenty as Anna
Dina Gralla as Gerda von Hohenstein
Gyula Szőreghy as Walberg, civil engineer
Julius Falkenstein as Advisor von Gernsdorff
Paul Rehkopf as Stummelmaxe
Lu Däne
Karl Elzer
Karl Falkenberg
Eddie Seefeld

References

External links

Films of the Weimar Republic
German silent feature films
Films directed by Carl Boese
1928 comedy films
German comedy films
National Film films
German black-and-white films
Silent comedy films
Films shot at Terra Studios
1920s German films